George Lefevre may refer to:
 George Shaw Lefevre, 1st Baron Eversley, British politician
 Sir George William Lefevre, English physician and travel writer
 George Le Fevre, politician and surgeon in the colony of Victoria, Australia

See also
 Georges Lefèvre, French fencer
 Georges Lefebvre, French historian